The Aviation Policing Command (APC) now renamed as Aviation Security Operational Unit (SO18) is a Specialist Operations unit of London's Metropolitan Police Service. The unit is responsible for providing policing and security for both Heathrow and London City airports. London's other airports, Gatwick, Stansted and Luton are policed by Sussex, Essex, and Bedfordshire Police respectively, as they are not located in the Metropolitan Police District.

History

Policing at Heathrow was initially undertaken by the Civil Aviation Authority. In 1965, the responsibility was taken over by the British Airports Authority Constabulary, which subsequently passed to the Metropolitan Police on 1 November 1974 as a consequence of the Policing of Airports Act 1974.

Policing of London City Airport has always been undertaken by the Metropolitan Police, with Aviation Security acquiring the remit from local officers during 2004.

Policing today

The unit employs around 400 police officers, the vast majority being trained Firearms Officers. Along with carrying out routine policing, Aviation Security must always guard against terrorism and be ready to respond to an aircraft emergency. Human trafficking is another area policed, with close working relationships existing with the United Kingdom Border Force and UK Visas and Immigration. Traffic wardens and Police Community Support Officers work at both airports.

In 2005 the Metropolitan Police Commissioner, Sir Ian Blair, announced that Specialist Operations units were to be re-aligned. The plans included forming three new departments within Specialist Operations to carry out specific functions:

 Protecting People, (Splitting the functions of both SO14 & SO16 and merging them with parts of SO17, SO18 and SO12)
 Protecting Places, (Splitting the functions of both SO14 & SO16 and merging them with parts of SO17 and SO18)
 Counter Terrorism Command (Merging SO12 & SO13 together)

Firearms commonly used for armed airport policing duties:

 Heckler & Koch MP5 A3 (Semi-Automatic Carbine)
 Heckler & Koch G36C  (Semi-Automatic Carbine)
SIG Sauer 519
 Glock 17 (Pistol)
 X2 Taser
 
Armed Response Airport Vehicles patrol the entry and exit points to the main terminal buildings, the perimeter roads and respond to firearms calls in local boroughs. There are also armed foot patrols inside.

Aviation and Roads Policing Unit (Traffic Unit)

One of the key operational units within SO18 is the Aviation and Road Policing Unit.

The unit is manned by a small group of traffic officers, trained in Road Collision Investigation, Traffic Law Enforcement are experienced in dealing with collisions and incidents involving vehicles around the airport. They also work alongside the Air Accidents Investigation Branch (AAIB) of the Department for Transport where a vehicle may have been involved in an aircraft collision.

The officers can be distinguished from their armed colleagues as they wear white caps, high visibility jackets and drive conventionally motorway marked battenburg liveried vehicles and are unarmed. They can be regularly seen on the strategic motorway network surrounding the airport, the perimeter roads and also on the terminal forecourts where, along with enforcing the road traffic regulations and assisting the free flow of vehicles, they undertake a highly visible public reassurance counter-terrorism role.

This small group of highly specialised officers have led the implementation of new legislation, the Railway & Transport Safety Act to regulate drink flying offences in the UK. Seen as being particularly controversial, information about a suspected offence is normally received from either the airline or airport security personnel. Having informed police, there is a requirement that such allegations are investigated which is undertaken by these officers. Utilising special breath test devices, officers screen crews accused of having consumed alcohol to prove or disprove the allegation. These rules relate not only to pilots, air traffic controllers, cabin crews but also to ground engineers. Penalties imposed by Courts are particularly severe although the majority of individuals who have been convicted have been foreign members of crew working for foreign carriers.

See also
Airport security in the United Kingdom

References

External links
SO18 Homepage

Metropolitan Police units